The discography of the Indonesian band Kekal includes nine full-length studio albums, two EPs, two compilation albums, two demo tapes, a split album with Slechtvalk, and several contributions to various collaborative albums. Though the band currently has no active members, it continues to exist as an institution, and still releases new material.

Kekal formed in 1995 in Jakarta, Indonesia, and released an unofficial four-song demo tape. As this demo began to circulate, additional members joined to release an official demo album called Contra Spiritualia Nequitae in 1996, and in 1998 Kekal released its self-produced debut album, Beyond the Glimpse of Dreams, which gained the band international attention. The following year, 1999, the band released Embrace the Dead, followed by The Painful Experience in 2001. The departure of guitarist Leo Setiawan in 2001 left the band as a duo consisting of Jeff Arwadi and Azhar Levi Sianturi, but the band continued and released the highly progressive and experimental 1000 Thoughts of Violence in 2003, which led to a two-week European mini-tour in March 2004. Upon return to Indonesia, Kekal recorded Acidity, which was released in 2005, and marked the return of Leo to the band. This album was considered by many to be the band's strongest release to date, and The Habit of Fire was recorded in 2006. However, Jeff's relocation to Canada left the status of the band in question, but it was decided to keep the band as a studio project, and The Habit of Fire was released in 2007, and was named "CD of the Month" by technology magazine Sound on Sound. In 2008, the band's seventh full-length album, Audible Minority, was intended to be released on December 25, 2008, as both a digital free download and a limited edition Digipak with a total of 11 songs. The CD version was never released, and the album ended up being offered only as a free download instead.

In 2009, all band members left Kekal, but it was decided to keep the band simply as a legal institution. Despite this, former members of the band contributed to an eighth studio album, entitled 8, which was officially released in December 2010 and was made available to purchase on January 23, 2011. On July 10, 2011, a free digital-only EP entitled Futuride was released, and a ninth full-length release, Autonomy, was released on December 19, 2012.

Albums

Studio albums

Extended plays

Compilation albums

Demos

Singles

Videos

Music videos

Contributions

Collaborations

Sample contributions

References

External links
 Official website

Discographies of Indonesian artists
Electronic music discographies
Heavy metal group discographies